Loïc Maes is a Belgian video director.

He collaborates on a regular basis with top photographers Nick Knight, Steven Meisel, and Pierre Debuscschere for platinum brands including Issey Miyake, Balenciaga, Hermes, Marni, Max Factor, Y-3, Hugo Boss, and Range Rover.
In beauty work, Loic often partners with hip-hop superstar director Collin Tilley for artists including Mary J Blige, Keri Hilson, Ciara, Nicki Minaj, P Diddy, Melanie Fiona, Diddy Dirty Money, Chris Brown, Justin Bieber, and Ne-Yo.

As a director, Loic has developed a unique style that's sexy, edgy and full of fantasy. Clients range from Grammy Winner Kelly Price and European chart toppers Infernal, to BMW, Vogue, Avon, and Nivea.
In 2008, he created an acclaimed triptych video installation for Francois Rousseau's exhibition L'Atelier, and in 2011 he collaborated with Nick Knight on Lady Gaga's "Born This Way", which received several awards, including MTV's Video of the Year.

Most recently, in 2013, he released an acclaimed short film for New York City's premier contemporary dance company, Cedar Lake.

Director's Work

Art Films

Music Videos

Commercials

Post Production Work

Commercials

Music

References

External links 
 
 Infernal Official Website
 Paradoxal Productions NY

Living people
Belgian film directors
Year of birth missing (living people)